Francesco Sforza (1401–1466), was the first Duke of Milan of the Sforza dynasty.

Francesco Sforza  may also refer to:

Francesco Sforza (il Duchetto) (1491–1512), son of Gian Galeazzo Maria Sforza
Francesco II Sforza (1495–1535), son of Ludovico il Moro and last Duke of Milan of the Sforza dynasty
Francesco Sforza (cardinal) (1562–1624), cardinal of Santa Romana Chiesa